Funny or Die Presents is a half-hour sketch comedy show that spawned from the comedy website Funny or Die, created by Will Ferrell and Adam McKay. It premiered on HBO on February 19, 2010.

Creation
Funny or Die Presents was created in June 2008 when HBO bought a stake in Funnyordie.com and commissioned that at least 10 episodes be broadcast on HBO as part of the deal.

Description
Every show consists of several comedy sketches that vary in length and can contain several sketches or even one full length sketch.

Format
The program is viewed as if you are watching a television network called "The Funny or Die Network" (sometimes referred to as FOD) which is a hybrid network that fuses the internet with television. Each sketch is viewed as a show on this network, some shows are mini-series, some are shown in parts and some are one offs, only appearing once.
In the first episode the network is described as:

What you are about to see is nothing short of a miracle. Television so revolutionary that at this point in time, there is nothing like it anywhere.

Now you may ask yourself: "How is this possible?"
Computers, that's how! Funny or die is at the forefront of computer technology, leading the way in computer comedy programming. Tonight marks a departure from our usual business model as we join the ever declining world of broadcast television. Think of what you're about to see as kind of a network unto itself, a half-hour network complete with its own lineup of wonderful shows. Basically, the same kinda horseshit we throw up on our website.

-Ed Haligan, Head of West Coast sales & marketing

Each episode of Season 1 starts in a white room with Ed Haligan (played by Steve Tom) who introduces the show and leads into a starting theme and a "network schedule" which describes the sketches being featured in that particular episode.

Notable sketches
"1000 Cats"
 "Drunk History"
"Derek Waters LOL"
"Playground Politics"
"Designated Driver"
"The Amazing Adventures of David and Jennie"
"Sleeping with Celebrities"
"Welcome to my Study"
"The Slovin & Allen Show"
"Holdup"
"The Carpet Brothers"
"Just 3 Boyz" and "The Terrys" by Tim and Eric

Episodes

Cast
Steve Tom as Ed Haligan, the presenter.

The cast of the sketches often include notable celebrities, including:
Derek Waters
Malin Åkerman
Creed Bratton
Rachael Harris
Ed Helms
Rob Huebel
Rob Riggle
Paul Scheer
Brett Gelman
David Koechner
Jerry Minor
Will Ferrell
Chris Parnell
Thomas Lennon
Ian Roberts
Zach Galifianakis
John C. Reilly
Tim Heidecker
Eric Wareheim
David Spade
Zooey Deschanel
Rich Fulcher
June Diane Raphael
Kate Walsh
Busy Philipps
Don Cheadle
Tim Meadows
Elijah Wood
Crispin Glover
Kristen Wiig
Grey DeLisle
Maile Flanagan

Writing credits
Andrew Steele	        (9 episodes)
Jason Woliner 	(5 episodes)
Maggie Carey	(4 episodes)
Owen Burke	 	(4 episodes)
Paul Scheer	(4 episodes)
Rob Riggle	 	(4 episodes)
Rob Huebel	 	(4 episodes)
Mike O'Connell	(4 episodes)
Neal Brennan	(4 episodes)
Tim Heidecker      (3 episodes)
Eric Wareheim      (3 episodes)
Andrea Savage 	(3 episodes)
Leo Allen	 	(2 episodes)
Tom Gianas	 	(2 episodes)
David Neher	        (2 episodes)
David Koechner     (2 episodes)
Jennie Pierson	        (2 episodes)
T. Sean Shannon	(2 episodes)
Eric Slovin	        (2 episodes)
Derek Waters	        (2 episodes)
Will Ferrell	(1 episode)
Chris Henchy	(1 episode)
Adam McKay	 	(1 episode)
Zach Galifianakis   (1 episode)

References

2010s American sketch comedy television series
2010 American television series debuts
2011 American television series endings
English-language television shows
HBO original programming
Television series based on Internet-based works
Television series by Apatow Productions
Television series by Funny or Die
Television series by Gary Sanchez Productions